Roselaine Benites (born 27 May 1981) is a Brazilian long-distance runner. She competed in the marathon event at the 2015 World Championships in Athletics in Beijing, China.

See also
 Brazil at the 2015 World Championships in Athletics

References

Brazilian female long-distance runners
Living people
Place of birth missing (living people)
1981 births
World Athletics Championships athletes for Brazil